Kulaura is the biggest upazila (subdistrict) of the Moulvibazar District in north-eastern Bangladesh. The total area of this upazila is 545 km2. Hakaluki Haor, the largest marsh wetland in Sylhet and one of the largest in Bangladesh is partially located there.

Etymology
According to Tarikh-i-Halimi, Mamand Mansur, a famous Dewan of Mansur village, had an uncle called Mamantad Kulaor Kumar who was the brother of Mansur's father Mamand Manuhar. After the death of Kulaor Kumar, a market was established on the eastern part of his own zamindari and named as "Kulaor Bazar". Over time, Kulaorar Bazar changed to Kulaura.

History

Many archaeological sites and relics such as the Vidia Ashram in Rangirkul, Gagan Tila, Chand Gram Dighi and the copper plates of Bhatera provide evidence for early settlements in Kulaura.

Following the Conquest of Sylhet in 1303, Shah Halim ad-Din of Narnaul and his son, Dawlat Shah Abdul Malik, migrated to Kanihati ruled by the King Aslam Roy of Kailashahar. Roy insisted on rewarding him some of his land, after receiving assistance in capturing a tiger. Roy and his courtiers made a decision that they would fire an arrow (teer) and wherever it lands, that land would be given to Helimuddin. This place was named Teerpasha and later became known as Tarapasha in Rajnagar. After becoming a Muslim, Roy felt that the Shah was more deserving of his kingdom and so he migrated elsewhere to seek further knowledge, leaving behind his wife, Kanak Rani Kani. Helimuddin built her a house and pond remain in existence as Kanir Bari and Kanir Pukur. Queen Kani's daughter, Princess Rajrani, grew a love for the religion of Islam, eventually becoming a Muslima, changing her name to Bibi Hamira and marrying Dawlat Malik. The Queen also became a Muslim. The descendants of this family became known as the Zamindars of Kanihati.

In 1499, a Persian nobleman from Khorasan known as Prince Sakhi Salamat settled in Prithimpassa, Kulaura. Being a wealthy nobleman; he was granted a jagir in mouza Prithimpassa from where he established the Prithimpassa family. His son, Ismail Khan Lodi, was granted a jagir by the Mughals and given the status of Nawab in addition to other prestigious titles.

In 1756, the Nawab of Longla Moulvi Muhammad Rabi Khan Danishmand established the famous Rabir Bazar (Rabi's Market). Begum Talib-un-Nisa Khatun of Chhoto Saheb Bari (Prithimpasha village) established the Rabir Bazar Jame Masjid.

The East India Company first heavily influenced their trading of tea in Kulaura. It became an important location for tea cultivation in Bengal and major export. Local entrepreneurs also started founding their estates such as Nawab Ali Amjad Khan who established the Rungicherra (also Rungichara) Tea Estate.

In the anti-British Sepoy Mutiny of 1857, 300 sepoys who revolted against the British, looted the Chittagong Treasury and took shelter with Nawab Gaus Ali Khan of Prithimpassa. The treasury remained under rebel control for several days. Abdul Ghafur, grandfather of Ali Haydar ibn Ali Gawhar, of Kanihati was present during the mutiny.

In 1921, the non-cooperation movement also spread to Kulaura after being established by Purnendu Kishore Sengupta in Vidia Ashram, Rangirkul. In 1939, there was an anti-British protest held in Nabin Chandra School. Many students were attacked and expelled by the British forces based in Kalapani Haor.

In 1950, the Shah of Iran, Mohammad Reza Pahlavi, visited Prithimpassa and stayed for four days at the palace and went wildlife hunting in the Estate forests alongside Khwaja Nazimuddin and Ayub Khan.

During the Bangladesh Liberation War, Kulaura was the centre of the Battle of Gazipur in Gazipur Tea Garden. The battle raged from the 4th to the 5th of December 1971 and was a prelude to the Battle of Sylhet. The Pakistani army camped in Kulaura Hospital and Nabin Chandra School and killed over 100 Bengali freedom fighters and civilians. Chiral Muchir Bari, bank of Padma Dighi of Ali Amjad High School were experienced mass killings. A graveyard in Chatolgaon hosts many martyrs.

Geography 

The location of Kulaura upazila is 24.5167 degrees north latitudes up to 92.0333 degrees East longitude. The Area size 679.25 square kilometers (262 square miles). Barolekha, Juri and Fenchuganj Upazilas on the north, Rajnagar and Kamalganj upazila on the west, Tripura of India on the south, Tripura and Assam in the east of Kulaura.

The largest Haor of in Asia, 'Hakaluki's most of area is under Kulaura. Also Longlia, Gualzoor etc. are the notable Haor. The highest peak in the Sylhet region, Kala pahar, can be found in Kulaura Upazila.

Economy and tourism 
Kulaura is home to many tourist attractions and natural geography. It contains many hills, tea gardens and the largest haor in Asia; the Hakaluki Haor. Other sites include the Prithimpassa Nawab Estate, Rabir Bazar Jame Masjid, and the mausoleums of Haji Pir in Sharifpur, Shah Hamid Faruqi in Kaukapon and Shah Helimuddin Qurayshi Chowdhury Bazar. The historic mazar of Shah Helimuddin Narnuli near Manu Rail Station was destroyed due to a flood.

Demographics 
At the 1991 Bangladesh census, Kulaura had a population of 339,673, of whom 171,346 were aged 18 or older. Males constituted 51.09% of the population and females 48.91%. Kulaura had an average literacy rate of 28.8% (7+ years) compared to the national average of 32.4%.

Administration
Kulaura Upazila is divided into Kulaura Municipality and 13 union parishads: Baramchal, Bhatera, Bhukshimail, Brammanbazar, Hazipur, Joychandi, Kadipur, Kormodha, Kulaura, Prithimpassa, Rauthgaon, Sharifpur, and Tilagaon union. The union parishads are subdivided into 128 mauzas and 447 villages.

Kulaura Municipality is subdivided into 9 wards and 26 mahallas.

Notable people
 Abdul Jabbar, politician and former member of parliament
 Nadia Shah, politician, councillor and former Mayor of Camden. In May 2016, she became the first female British Bangladeshi mayor.
 Kanihati zamindars
 Abed Chaudhury, geneticist
 Abdul Muntaquim Chaudhury, former Member of the Pakistan National Assembly
 Sadeq Ali, writer, poet and judge best known for the Halat-un-Nabi puthi
 Sultan Mohammad Mansur Ahmed, politician, Former VP of DUCSU, Former President of Bangladesh Chhatra League, Former Organising Secretary of Bangladesh Awami League and the Current Member of the Jatiya Sangsad from Moulvibazar-2. 
 Rawshan Ara Bachchu, Bengali Language Movement activist
 Zamindars of Monraj 
 A. N. M. Yusuf - Bangladesh Muslim League politician
 Abul Hasan - cricketer
 MM Shahin - politician
 Shafiqur Rahman - physician and Amir of the Bangladesh Jamaat-e-Islami
 Abdul Matin - former MP for Moulvibazar-2
 Prithimpassa Family - aristocratic family of the erstwhile feudal nobility of East Bengal

 Nawab Ali Amjad Khan - 8th Nawab of Longla and Honorary Magistrate. 
 Nawab Ali Abbas Khan - Jatiya Party politician
 Nawab Ali Haider Khan - 9th Nawab of Longla and politician

See also 
Upazilas of Bangladesh
Districts of Bangladesh
Divisions of Bangladesh

References

External links 
 www.moulvibazar.com